Poisoned Minds: The Paris Concert is a live album by saxophonist Tim Berne's Bloodcount and second volume of the series which was recorded in 1994 and released on the JMT label.

Reception
The AllMusic review by Dave Lynch said "Poisoned Minds is for serious listeners without attenuated attention spans, a somewhat radical concept in itself. Yet aside from the lengths of the pieces, many elements of the music are not particularly radical despite Berne's avant-garde rep -- melody, rhythm, and theme are all important to the saxophonist, and the innovation comes from the way he manipulates structure, fitting the pieces of the puzzle together in unpredictable ways".

Track listing
All compositions by Tim Berne
 "The Other" - 27:35   
 "What Are the Odds? Speed/J.B.'s Stove/A Slight Discrepancy in the Figures" - 41:28

Personnel
Tim Berne - alto saxophone, baritone saxophone
Chris Speed - tenor saxophone, clarinet
Marc Ducret - electric guitar
Michael Formanek - contrabass
Jim Black - drums

References 

1995 live albums
Tim Berne live albums
JMT Records live albums
Winter & Winter Records live albums